was a town located in Mihara District, Hyōgo Prefecture, Japan. It consisted of a part of Awaji Island and the much smaller . It is located at the southern end of Awaji island, from which it also derived its name.

As of 2003, the town had an estimated population of 18,921 and a density of 217.63 persons per km2. The total area was 86.94 km2.

On January 11, 2005, Nandan, along with the towns of Mihara, Midori and Seidan (all from Mihara District), was merged to create the city of Minamiawaji.

Dissolved municipalities of Hyōgo Prefecture
Minamiawaji, Hyōgo